Common polypody is a common name for several ferns in the genus Polypodium and may refer to:

Polypodium virginianum, native to North America
Polypodium vulgare, native to Europe